Frank Yates Lethbridge (22 May 1852 – 26 January 1915) was an independent conservative Member of Parliament in New Zealand.

He represented the Rangitikei electorate from 1896 to 1902, and then the Oroua electorate from 1902 to 1908, when he retired.

References

1852 births
1915 deaths
New Zealand MPs for North Island electorates
Members of the New Zealand House of Representatives
Independent MPs of New Zealand
19th-century New Zealand politicians